The pelvic thrust is the thrusting motion of the pelvic region, which is used for a variety of activities, such as dance or sexual activity.

Sexual activity

The pelvic thrust is used during copulation by many species of mammals, including humans, or for other sexual activities (such as non-penetrative sex).  In 2007, German scientists noted that female monkeys could increase the vigor and amount of pelvic thrusts made by the male by shouting during intercourse. In whitetail deer, copulation consists of a single pelvic thrust.

Dance 

One of the first to perform this move on stage was Elvis Presley. It was quite controversial due to its obvious sexual connotations.  Due to this controversy, he was sometimes shown (as seen on his third appearance on The Ed Sullivan Show) from the waist up on TV. Later, the pelvic thrust also became one of the signature moves of Michael Jackson. It is also mentioned in "Time Warp", a song from The Rocky Horror Show, as a part of the choreography associated with the warp itself. Twerking, a reverse and sometimes passive form of pelvic thrust dance move, is also a very popular form of hip-hop dance move. The sideways pelvic thrust is a famous female dance move in India and Bangladesh and known as thumka. It appears in the lyrics of various Bollywood songs.

Exercise 
As an exercise, bodybuilders commonly add weights (either a barbell or plate) to train the gluteus maximus muscle.

Infants 
Pelvic thrusting is observed in infant monkeys, apes, and humans. These observations led ethologist John Bowlby (1969) to suggest that infantile sexual behavior may be the rule in mammals, not the exception. Thrusting has been observed in humans at eight to 10 months of age and may be an expression of affection. Typically, the infant clings to the parent, then nuzzles, thrusts, and rotates the pelvis for several seconds.

See also
 Lordosis behavior
 Twerking

References

Bibliography

Pelvis
Dance moves
Sexual acts